San Antonio is a village in the Cayo District of Belize. In 2000, the village of San Antonio had a population of 2,124 people. Its population is predominantly Yukatek-speaking Maya.

Populated places in Cayo District
Cayo Central